Yuriy Illich Mate (born 7 January 1999) is a Ukrainian professional footballer who plays as a centre-back for Ukrainian club Obolon Kyiv.

References

External links
 Profile on Obolon Kyiv official website
 

1999 births
Living people
Footballers from Donetsk
Ukrainian footballers
Association football defenders
FC Shakhtar Donetsk players
FC Obolon-Brovar Kyiv players
FC Obolon-2 Kyiv players
Ukrainian First League players
Ukrainian Second League players